North Eastern Boroughs was an electoral district of the Legislative Assembly in the Australian state of New South Wales from 1856 to 1859, that included the towns of Newcastle, Stockton and Raymond Terrace. It was partly replaced by the electoral district of Newcastle and the electoral district of Hunter.

Members for North Eastern Boroughs

Election results

1856

1858
Flood did not contest the seat at the 1858 election, successfully standing for Cumberland (South Riding) instead.

References

North Eastern Boroughs
Port Stephens Council
1856 establishments in Australia
1859 disestablishments in Australia